XECOPA-AM (La Voz de los Vientos – "The Voice of the Winds") is an indigenous community radio station that broadcasts in Spanish, Zoque and Tzotzil from Copainalá, in the Mexican state of Chiapas. 
It is run by the Cultural Indigenist Broadcasting System (SRCI) of the National Commission for the Development of Indigenous Peoples (CDI).

External links
XECOPA website

References

Radio stations in Chiapas
Sistema de Radiodifusoras Culturales Indígenas
Radio stations established in 1997
Daytime-only radio stations in Mexico